Shiv Charan Mathur (14 February 1927 – 25 June 2009) was an Indian politician. A leader of the Indian National Congress, he was Chief Minister of Rajasthan from 1981 to 1985 and again from 1988 to 1989; later, he was Governor of Assam from 2008 to 2009.

Mathur became Chief Minister of Rajasthan on 14 July 1981 and held that post until 23 February 1985. The killing of Raja Man Singh, the then titular head of the erstwhile princely state of Bharatpur caused a political storm, leading to his resignation. Subsequently, he became Chief Minister again from 20 January 1988 to 4 December 1989. In 2003 he was elected as a MLA from Mandalgarh (Bhilwara).

Appointed Governor of Assam in 2008, he remained in that post until his death from cardiac arrest on 25 June 2009.

Positions held
General Secretary, Rajasthan Students Congress (1945–1947)

Chairman, Municipal Board, Bhilwara (1956–57)

Member of Rajasthan Pradesh Congress Committee (1967)

Member of All India Congress Committee (1972-till date)

Pramukh, Zila Parishad, Bhilwara (1960–64)

Member Third Lok Sabha (1964–1967)

Member, Rajasthan State Legislative Assembly (1967–72, 1972–77, 1980–85, 1985–90, 1990–91, 1998–2003, 2003-)

Chairman Public Undertakings Committee of the Rajasthan Legislative Assembly (1980–81)

Convenor, Rules Committee of Rajasthan Legislative Assembly (1985–87)

Chairman, Subordinate Legislation Committee of Rajasthan Legislative Assembly (1987–88)

Minister for Education, Power, PWD, Public Relations in the Rajasthan Cabinet (1967–72)

Minister for Food and Civil Supplies, Agriculture, Animal Husbandry, Dairy and Planning in the Rajasthan Cabinet (1973–77)

Chief Minister of Rajasthan (1981–85 and 1988–89)

Member, Tenth Lok Sabha (1991–96)

Chairman, Committee on Privileges, Lok Sabha, (1991–96)

Convenor of Sub-Committee on Energy, Lok Sabha (1994–96)

Member, Executive Committee, Commonwealth Parliamentary Association (1994–96)

Life Chairman, Social Policy Research Institute, Jaipur (1985)

Chairman, Estimates Committee, Rajasthan Legislative Assembly (1998–2003)

Chairman, Administrative Reforms Commission Rajasthan (1999–2003)

Member, Rules Committee of Rajasthan Legislative Assembly (2004)

References

External links
 Shiv charan Mathur Dead
 Photographs of Former Chief Ministers of Rajasthan
Mr S C Mathur sworn as Assam Governor

1927 births
2009 deaths
Chief Ministers of Rajasthan
Rajasthani people
Governors of Assam
India MPs 1991–1996
Lok Sabha members from Rajasthan
People from Bhilwara
Chief ministers from Indian National Congress
India MPs 1962–1967
Indian National Congress politicians from Rajasthan
Rajasthan MLAs 1967–1972
Rajasthan MLAs 1972–1977
Rajasthan MLAs 1980–1985
Rajasthan MLAs 1990–1992
Rajasthan MLAs 1998–2003
Rajasthan MLAs 2003–2008